Carl William Raisch (April 5, 1905 – July 31, 1984) was an American dancer, actor, stuntman and acting coach. He was best known as the One-Armed Man pursued by Richard Kimble (David Janssen) on the 1963–1967 TV series The Fugitive.

Early life
Carl William Raisch was born on April 5, 1905, in North Bergen, New Jersey. His parents were German immigrants.

After graduating high school, Raisch found a job hauling cement in a construction site. He began lifting weights and also became an amateur boxer. As a dancing partner to a young woman whom he took to socials and dances, he was introduced to Florenz Ziegfeld Jr., who signed him to the Ziegfeld Follies dance troupe. Raisch performed on stage in his first American production at the New Amsterdam Roof Theater in the late 1920s. He primarily performed with the dance troupe in New York, and was also an adagio performer. He married Adele Smith, a fellow Ziegfeld dancer.

Acting career
In the beginning of 1945, during his World War II service with the United States Merchant Marine, Raisch's right arm was badly burned in a shipboard fire and had to be amputated at the elbow. Raisch had acted in a few uncredited film roles before the war, but afterwards pursued a film career, moving to Los Angeles in 1946. Raisch appeared in The War of the Worlds (1953) as "an extra, stand-in, and occasional stuntman", and in Spartacus (1960), playing a character whose arm was hacked off in battle. For the latter stunt, Kirk Douglas as Spartacus chopped off Raisch's prosthetic limb with a sword.

Raisch's first memorable film role was as a one-armed character who initiates a barroom brawl with Douglas's cowboy character in Lonely are the Brave (1962). The following year, Raisch became the "One-Armed Man"—a shadowy drifter implicated in a brutal murder—in the television series The Fugitive, which ran from 1963 to 1967. Raisch was seen extremely infrequently on the show, making only four fairly brief appearances over the series' first three seasons before becoming more prominent in the fourth and final season. However, his character was frequently mentioned, and beginning in season 2 "The One-Armed Man" was seen in the opening credits of every episode of The Fugitive, making Raisch's image a well-known pop culture figure. In the series' final episode, Raisch's character was proved to be the true killer of the wife of Dr. Richard Kimble, played by David Janssen. TV Guide named The One-Armed Man No. 5 in their 2013 list of The 60 Nastiest Villains of All Time.

Raisch worked as actor Burt Lancaster's stand-in in several films, although Lancaster was four inches taller than he.

Raisch's disability led to his being typecast, usually as a criminal. He subsequently worked in Los Angeles as an acting coach. He died of lung cancer in a Santa Monica, California, hospital on July 31, 1984, aged 79. His body was cremated and his ashes scattered at sea.

Filmography

References

External links

1905 births
1984 deaths
20th-century American male actors
American amputees
American male television actors
American people of German descent
Burials at Woodlawn Memorial Cemetery, Santa Monica
Deaths from lung cancer in California
Military personnel from New Jersey
People from North Bergen, New Jersey
United States Navy sailors